HMS Vengeance is the fourth and final  of the Royal Navy. Vengeance carries the Trident ballistic missile, the UK's nuclear deterrent.

Vengeance was built at Barrow-in-Furness by Vickers Shipbuilding and Engineering Ltd, later BAE Systems Submarine Solutions, was launched in September 1998, and commissioned in November 1999.

Before she was commissioned, the British Government stated that once the Vanguard submarines became fully operational, they would only carry 200 warheads.

Vengeance carries unopened "last instructions" (letters of last resort) of the current British Prime Minister that are to be used in the event of a national catastrophe or a nuclear strike; this letter is identical to the letters carried on board the other three submarines of the Vanguard class.

Operational history

On 31 March 2011, while on a training exercise Vengeance suffered a blockage in her propulsor causing a reduction in propulsion. The boat returned to Faslane naval base on the surface under her own power. According to the MOD the problems were not nuclear related.

In 2012, Vengeance started a 40 month refit at HMNB Devonport near Plymouth which refueled her reactor and renewed her machinery and electronics.  During that period her sister ship Vigilant took her place in the patrol rotations. She sailed from Devonport on 4 December 2015, her place in refit being taken by Vanguard.  Vengeance then went through trials from January 2016 to June 2016 and fired an unarmed D5 missile during her Demonstration and Shakedown Operation (DASO) which allowed her to return to the fleet. Whilst the firing of the missile was a success, the missile itself suffered a failure during flight and the test was terminated.

Affiliations
The Royal Scots Dragoon Guards (Carabiniers and Greys)
Worshipful Company of Salters
Bury St Edmunds

See also
 List of submarines of the Royal Navy
 List of submarine classes of the Royal Navy
 Nuclear weapons and the United Kingdom
 Royal Navy Submarine Service
 Submarine-launched ballistic missile
 Trident nuclear programme

References

External links

 

 

Vanguard-class submarines
Ships built in Barrow-in-Furness
1998 ships
Submarines of the United Kingdom